Histricosceptrum is a genus of sea snails, marine gastropod mollusks in the family Turbinellidae.

Species
Species within the genus Histricosceptrum include:

 Histricosceptrum atlantis (Clench & Aguayo, 1938)
 Histricosceptrum bartletti (Clench & Aguayo, 1940)
 Histricosceptrum xenismatis (Harasewych, 1983)

References

External links

Turbinellidae